The 1894 Vermont gubernatorial election took place on September 4, 1894. Incumbent Republican Levi K. Fuller, per the "Mountain Rule", did not run for re-election to a second term as Governor of Vermont. Republican candidate Urban A. Woodbury defeated Democratic candidate George W. Smith to succeed him.

Results

References

Vermont
1894
Gubernatorial
September 1894 events